Saleh Ahmed (1936/1937 – 24 April 2019) was a Bangladeshi television, film and stage actor.

Life and career

Ahmed was born in Sariakandi, Bogra. He started acting at a young age with a Mymensingh-based troupe named Amraboti Natyamancho. After his retirement from the Department of Public Health Engineering in 1991, he started acting on a regular basis.

Death

Ahmed died on 24 April 2019 at the age of 83.

Works

TV dramas
 Aaj Robibar
 Kothao Keu Nei
 Ure Jai Bok Pokkhi
 Vara Basha Bhalo Basha

Films
 Amar Ache Jol
 Srabon Megher Din 
 Aguner Poroshmoni

References

External links
 

1930s births
2019 deaths
People from Bogra District
Bangladeshi male television actors
Bangladeshi male film actors
Bangladeshi male stage actors
Date of birth missing